The Signalhorn (2,911 m) is a mountain of the Swiss Pennine Alps, located south of Eischoll in the canton of Valais. It lies between the valleys of Turtmann and Ginals.

References

External links
 Signalhorn on Hikr

Mountains of the Alps
Mountains of Switzerland
Mountains of Valais
Two-thousanders of Switzerland